Mei (or  in Taiwan), full name Dr. Mei-Ling Zhou, is a fictional, playable character appearing in the 2016 video game Overwatch, a team-based first-person shooter developed by Blizzard Entertainment. Outside of Overwatch, Mei also appears in related media, as well as a playable character in the crossover multiplayer online battle arena game Heroes of the Storm. She is a Chinese climatologist and adventurer from Xi'an, China.

Mei is voiced by Chinese voice actress Yu "Elise" Zhang in both the English and Chinese language releases of Overwatch.

Development and design
Mei was first announced in October 2015 at BlizzCon; along with D.Va and Genji, she was one of the last heroes who was introduced into Overwatch prior to its official release. At the beginning, Blizzard wanted to design a hero who used frost to battle. At that time, the nationality of this hero was not decided yet, but the designers once thought to set the hero as a Canadian. Later, being impressed by the ice and snow sculptures of Harbin in China, the design team finally decided to set the hero as Chinese. Additionally, her initial design was more oriented towards being a bounty hunter named "Frostbite", using her ice and frost powers in order to trap prey. However, as they developed her art style, the team found inspiration in an image of a "cute, nerdy scientist" which they loved, as it gave the idea that normal everyday people could be inspired to be a hero and be part of the Overwatch team.

One voice line of Mei's character was added into the game after being inadvertently inspired during a recording session by Zhang. Zhang had just flubbed one line and told Michael Chu, lead writer of Overwatch, and the recording engineer "sorry, sorry, sorry." Chu believed this was a great line, and used it along with other new lines to have Mei be apologetic, both sincerely and sarcastically, for her actions in-game.

Gameplay
Mei wields an Endothermic Blaster that can either freeze enemies in place with a short-range ice beam or shoot a long-range icicle projectile. Mei can also use the Blaster to encase herself in a solid ice block that blocks damage and heals her injuries, as well as erect temporary walls of solid ice with many versatile uses, primarily for blocking the enemies. Her ultimate ability is Blizzard, which calls down her personal weather modification drone Snowball to freeze all enemies in a wide radius.

Blizzard's designers have stated that for Overwatch 2, Mei's abilities will be altered to reflect the new gameplay style they want for the game. In particular, while Mei's ice beam will still slow and damage enemies, it will no longer freeze them in place.

Appearances

Overwatch
In the Overwatch lore, Mei was employed by the titular organization to find the cause for the planet's changing climate, which had been variously blamed on the industry, the increasing omnic population, and increased consumption of natural resources. While deployed at the "Ecopoint" Overwatch base in Antarctica, Mei and the other scientists there were trapped by a polar storm that damaged the facility. Lacking sufficient resources to wait for a rescue, they decided to enter cryostasis. Mei was the only survivor when she was found close to a decade later; by that time, Overwatch had disbanded, and all of the bases set up to monitor the climate crisis had stopped functioning. Mei elected to carry on the work alone, accompanied by Snowball.

Mei is the main character of the Overwatch animated short "Rise and Shine", released during Blizzard's presentation at the August 2017 Gamescom. The short film is an expanded retelling of Mei's origin story.

Heroes of the Storm
Mei was added as a playable character to the crossover multiplayer online battle arena game Heroes of the Storm in June 2020. Her character in Heroes maintains most of the same abilities as in Overwatch, though she is classified as a "tank" and has additional combat abilities.

Reception

As the first Chinese hero in Overwatch, Mei has garnered the interest of many players in China. Some players in China consider that Mei's background, combined with her pet phrase "Our world is worth fighting for", shows us a positive image of a female who determines to protect this world. Meanwhile, some other Chinese players question the design of Mei, because she wears a thick jacket and this makes her look not as slim as most of the other female heroes in Overwatch. Arnold Tsang, assistant art director of the game, clarified that Mei works in the polar regions and she has to wear thick clothes to keep warm.

During Overwatchs 2016 holiday event, a new game mode centered on Mei was added, called "Mei's Snowball Offensive", with each player controlling Mei. Her ice shield and ice wall abilities were left unchanged, but her blaster was replaced with a single-shot snowball thrower that would be an instant kill if it hit an unshielded opponent. The blaster could be reloaded by finding a patch of snow that randomly appeared on the map. Mei's ultimate ability enabled her to fire the snowball blaster several times without reloading for a short period of time. In addition to this, Blizzard created a new Legendary (highest rarity) skin for Mei that could be awarded during this event, which included a reskinning of her ice block into a snowman. Players criticized this new skin for being considered as Legendary, commenting that it was only a recolor of her base skin with a hat puff, and tool. Jeff Kaplan acknowledged the complaints, stating "We just sort of make a gut call based off of  what we think is cool. Coolness is very subjective, and based off of  the community reaction it seems like our gauge was off on this one."

Prior to the launch of the 2021 Overwatch League season, a new skin for Mei was released based on a mixed martial arts (MMA) outfit, named "MM-Mei". The skin gave Mei cornrows, a hairstyle common to people of African descent, but also had been used by MMA Chinese fighter Zhang Weili among other non-African people. Players criticized the skin as cultural appropriation since there were other types of closely-braided hairstyles from MMA fighters Blizzard could have used instead, in addition to the fact that Overwatch had yet to feature a female character of African-descent where that hairstyle would be better suited.

Use by Hong Kong protesters and supporters

On October 6, 2019, Blizzard suspended professional Hearthstone player Chung "Blitzchung" Ng Wai for making statements in support of the ongoing protests in Hong Kong during a Grandmasters livestream interview, with Blizzard asserting that Blitzchung had violated rules related to their behavior and respecting Blizzard's image. Blizzard's actions were criticized globally, and as part of the reactions, Hong Kong protesters and others began to illustrate Mei as a supporter of the protests as a show of solidarity against Blizzard's decision.

References

2019–2020 Hong Kong protests
Antarctica in fiction
Cryonically preserved characters in video games
Female characters in animated films
Female characters in comics
Female characters in video games
Fictional characters from Shaanxi
Fictional Chinese people in video games
Fictional conservationists and environmentalists
Fictional earth scientists
Fictional female doctors
Fictional female scientists
Fictional inventors in video games
Fictional meteorologists
Fictional scientists in video games
Fictional sole survivors
Overwatch characters
Video game characters introduced in 2016
Video game characters with ice or cold abilities
Fictional characters with healing abilities